In enzymology, a 2,4-dichlorobenzoyl-CoA reductase is an enzyme that catalyzes the chemical reaction

4-chlorobenzoyl-CoA + NADP+ + HCl  2,4-dichlorobenzoyl-CoA + NADPH + H+

The 3 substrates of this enzyme are 4-chlorobenzoyl-CoA, NADP+, and HCl, whereas its 3 products are 2,4-dichlorobenzoyl-CoA, NADPH, and H+.

This enzyme belongs to the family of oxidoreductases, specifically those acting on the CH-CH group of donor with NAD+ or NADP+ as acceptor.  The systematic name of this enzyme class is 4-chlorobenzoyl-CoA:NADP+ oxidoreductase (halogenating). This enzyme participates in 2,4-dichlorobenzoate degradation.

References

 

EC 1.3.1
NADPH-dependent enzymes
Enzymes of unknown structure